Rennes School of Business formerly École Supérieure de Commerce de Rennes is a French business school located in Rennes, the capital of Brittany, founded in 1990 by the Chamber of Commerce and Industry of Rennes. ESC Rennes is a Grande École.

History 

ESC Rennes, founded in 1990, is a research-based business school based in Rennes, Brittany, France. Based on its student body and faculty composition, Rennes School of Business is the most internationally attended Grande École de Commerce in France : 55% of the students on campus and 95% of the faculty members (90 nationalities) come from outside France.  A great majority of the courses are taught in English.

1990 - École Supérieure de Commerce de Rennes (ESC Rennes) founded.
1996 - ESC Rennes joins European Foundation for Management Development (EFMD)
1998 - ESC Rennes joins Conférence des Grandes Écoles
2004 - Master of Science program introduced
2007 - School renamed ESC Rennes School of Business
2004 - Bachelor program introduced
2010 - School opens a second campus in Rennes
2012 - AACSB accreditation
2013 - AMBA accreditation
2014 - EQUIS accreditation. ESC Rennes joins the 1% of business schools with the Triple Crown.
2016 - School renamed Rennes School of Business
2017 - Open a residence campus for international students
2019 - Creation of the Chair of Geopolitics
2020 - Creation of the Chair in Cyber Risk Governance
2021 - New campus opens in Paris

Rankings

Programmes

A key feature of the Rennes School of Business is its commitment to providing and growing a range of specialist Masters' programmes. Rennes School of business offers Masters of Science (MSc) and Master of Arts degrees also for holders of non-French bachelors.
  International Bachelor Program in Management
  Master of Arts in International Business
  Master in Management (Programme Grande École)
  15 Masters of Science:
  1.  MSc in Global Business Management
  2.  MSc in International Accounting, Management Control & Auditing
  3.  MSc in Creative Project Management, Culture & Design
  4.  MSc in International Negotiation & Business Development
  5.  MSc in Data and Business Analytics
  6.  MSc in Strategic & Digital Marketing
  7.  MSc in Financial Data Intelligence
  8.  MSc in International Finance (EPAS accredited)
  9.  MSc in Geopolitics & Business
  10. MSc in International Luxury & Brand Management
  11. MSc in Sports & Tourism Management
  12. MSc in Supply Chain Management
  13. MSc in Innovation & Entrepreneurship (partnership with Institut national des sciences appliquées)
  14. MSc in International Human Resource Management
  15. MSc in Sustainable Management & Eco-innovation

 PhD (full-time programs in Rennes, France, in cooperation with University College Dublin and the University of Amsterdam)
 Doctor of Business Administration (DBA) (part-time program for executives in China, Brazil and France). This programme is organized in cooperation with the School of Economics and Management at Beijing University of Post and Telecommunications in China and (as a pre-DBA) with Fundação Getulio Vargas in Rio de Janeiro, Brazil.
 MBA

Part-time programme
MBA with 6 majors: Advanced Finance; Corporate social responsibility; Innovation & entrepreneurship; Agrofood business; Digital marketing; Supply Chain Management.

Research

Research programs 

Rennes offers the following research programs: 
MPhil and PhD (full-time programs in Rennes, France, in cooperation with University College Dublin and the University of Amsterdam) 
Doctor of Business Administration (DBA) (part-time program for executives in China, Brazil and France)
The Global DBA program is organized in cooperation with the School of Economics and Management at Beijing University of Post and Telecommunications in China and (as a pre-DBA) with Fundação Getulio Vargas in Rio de Janeiro, Brazil.

Research Centers 

Rennes School of Business has 4 research centers carrying out academic research in partnership with companies.

 Center for Responsible Business 
 Center of Technology and Innovation Management
 Center of Research in Supply Chain and Operations Management
 Center of Financial Market & Corporate Outcomes

Students

 In 2020, 55% of the 5,000 students are international.

International dimension

 95% professors and 55% of students of non-French origin
 90 nationalities represented on the campus
 100% of courses taught in English in the programmes
 15 MSc programmes are also taught entirely in English

Alumni Association

The Association was founded by a group of ESC Rennes alumni. The association works in close partnership with Rennes School of Business and international companies to provide services to the global Rennes School of Business alumni community. The alumni network totalizes about 24,000 members in 100 countries.

References

External links
Rennes SB

Business schools in France
Educational institutions established in 1990
Education in Rennes
Universities and colleges in Rennes
1990 establishments in France